Mezőtúr is a district in south-eastern part of Jász-Nagykun-Szolnok County. Mezőtúr is also the name of the town where the district seat is found. The district is located in the Northern Great Plain Statistical Region. This district is a part of Nagykunság historical and geographical region.

Geography 
Mezőtúr District borders with Törökszentmiklós District and Karcag District to the north, Gyomaendrőd District (Békés County) to the east, Szarvas District (Békés County) and Kunszentmárton District to the south, Szolnok District to the west. The number of the inhabited places in Mezőtúr District is 5.

Municipalities 
The district has 2 towns and 3 villages.
(ordered by population, as of 1 January 2012)

The bolded municipalities are cities.

Demographics

In 2011, it had a population of 28,191 and the population density was 39/km².

Ethnicity
Besides the Hungarian majority, the main minority is the Roma (approx. 1,000).

Total population (2011 census): 28,191
Ethnic groups (2011 census): Identified themselves: 24,515 persons:
Hungarians: 23,576 (96.17%)
Gypsies: 618 (2.52%)
Others and indefinable: 321 (1.31%)
Approx. 3,500 persons in Mezőtúr District did not declare their ethnic group at the 2011 census.

Religion
Religious adherence in the county according to 2011 census:

Reformed – 5,688;
Catholic – 2,609 (Roman Catholic – 2,575; Greek Catholic – 34);
Evangelical – 103; 
other religions – 185; 
Non-religious – 12,292; 
Atheism – 316;
Undeclared – 6,998.

Transport

Road network
Main road  (NW→SE):  Törökszentmiklós... – Mezőtúr District (2 municipalities: Kétpó, Mezőtúr) – ...Mezőberény

Railway network
Line 120 (NW→SE): Budapest... – Mezőtúr District (2 municipalities: Kétpó, Törökszentmiklós) – ...Lőkösháza
Line 125 (N→E): Mezőtúr District (1 municipality: Mezőtúr) – ...Battonya

Gallery

See also
List of cities and towns of Hungary

References

External links
Mezőtúr District - HunMix.hu
Postal codes of the Mezőtúr District

Districts in Jász-Nagykun-Szolnok County